Hartley County is a county located in the U.S. state of Texas. As of the 2020 census, its population was 5,382. The county seat is Channing. The county was created in 1876 and later organized in 1891. It is named for Oliver C. Hartley and his brother, Rufus K. Hartley, two early Texas legislators and lawyers.

Geography

Major highways
  U.S. Highway 54
  U.S. Highway 87
  U.S. Highway 385
  State Highway 354

Adjacent counties
 Dallam County (north)
 Moore County (east)
 Oldham County (south)
 Quay County, New Mexico (southwest/Mountain Time Zone)
 Union County, New Mexico (northwest/Mountain Time Zone)

Demographics

Note: the US Census treats Hispanic/Latino as an ethnic category. This table excludes Latinos from the racial categories and assigns them to a separate category. Hispanics/Latinos can be of any race.

As of the census of 2000,  5,537 people, 1,604 households, and 1,220 families were residing in the county.  The population density was 4 people/sq mi (1/km2).  The 1,760 housing units had an average density of 1 /sq mi (0/km2).  The racial makeup of the county was 81.07% White, 8.15% African American, 0.43% Native American, 0.27% Asian,  8.65% from 
other races, and 1.43% from two or more races.  About 13.69% of the population were Hispanics or Latinos of any race. In ancestry, 21.0% were of German, 12.6% were of English, 12.3% were of Irish, 6.6% were of American, 4.3% were of French, 3.0% were of Scottish, and 3.0% were of Dutch.

Of the 1,604 households,  35.5% had children under 18 living with them, 68.9% were married couples living together, 4.7% had a female householder with no husband present, and 23.9% were not families; 21.6% of all households were made up of individuals, and 11.8% had someone living alone who was 65 or older.  The average household size was 2.56, and the average family size was 2.98.

In the county, the age distribution was 20.8% under 18, 4.7% from 18 to 24, 35.7% from 25 to 44, 26.9% from 45 to 64, and 11.90% who were 65 or older.  The median age was 40 years. For every 100 females, there were 154.10 males.  For every 100 females age 18 and over, there were 172.90 males.

The median income for a household in the county was $46,327, and for a family was $53,004. Males had a median income of $29,783 versus $21,783 for females. The per capita income for the county was $18,067.  About 3.70% of families and 6.60% of the population were below the poverty line, including 8.0% of those under age 18 and 5.3% of those age 65 or over.

Government and infrastructure
The Texas Department of Criminal Justice operates the Dalhart Unit prison in an unincorporated area in the county, near Dalhart.

Politics

Communities

Cities
 Channing (county seat)
 Dalhart (partly in Dallam County)

Census-designated place
 Hartley

Gallery

See also

 List of museums in the Texas Panhandle
 National Register of Historic Places listings in Hartley County, Texas
 Recorded Texas Historic Landmarks in Hartley County

References

External links
 Hartley County government’s website
 
 Hartley County Profile from the Texas Association of Counties

 
1891 establishments in Texas
Populated places established in 1891
Texas Panhandle